Shurak (also Romanized as Shūrak; also known as Shūrak Zangāneh and Zangāneh) is a village in Howmeh Rural District, in the Central District of Maneh and Samalqan County, North Khorasan Province, Iran. At the 2006 census, its population was 188, in 46 families.

References 

Populated places in Maneh and Samalqan County